Chimonanthus salicifolius  is a species of the genus of wintersweets Chimonanthus and member of the family Calycanthaceae.

Description
A semi-evergreen shrub up to 4 m tall, with slender leaves 3–13 cm long and 1–3 cm broad; flowers yellowish, late summer or autumn.

Distribution
Native
Palearctic
China: Anhui, Jiangxi, Zhejiang. 
Source:

References

Calycanthaceae